Geranylgeranyl-diphosphate diphosphohydrolase may refer to:
 Sclareol cyclase, an enzyme
 (13E)-labda-7,13-dien-15-ol synthase, an enzyme